Thought Gang is a studio album by American composers Angelo Badalamenti and David Lynch created under the joint moniker Thought Gang. Though released on November 2, 2018 through Sacred Bones Records, Thought Gang was originally recorded in the early 1990s. The album was preceded by a Lynch-directed music video for "A Real Indication" on November 1, 2018. The video was created in 1992 in the 8mm video format.

Background
In 1991, Angelo Badalamenti and David Lynch decided to form the jazz project Thought Gang. The short-lived effort lasted through 1993 and led to two tracks included on the soundtrack for Lynch's Twin Peaks: Fire Walk with Me (1992) and a few scattered pieces on other Lynch films, like 2001's Mulholland Drive and 2006's Inland Empire. On September 18, 2018, it was announced that a previously unreleased album under the title Thought Gang would be released on November 2 of that year. Lynch described Thought Gang as "a grand experiment", and Kory Grow of Rolling Stone called the music experimental free jazz with spoken word elements.

Critical reception

Thought Gang was met with mostly positive reception. The album received an average score of 70/100 from 5 reviews on Metacritic, indicating "generally favorable reviews". AllMusic's Bekki Bemrose acknowledged the difficulty and eccentricity of the music but recommended it to hardcore fans of Lynch and Badalamenti. She went on to write that the album's greatest asset is its "sound of two old friends having a great deal of mischievous fun". Andy Beta of Pitchfork expressed mixed feelings on the strangeness of the music (especially Badalamenti's spoken word vocals) and wrote, "As frightful and bewildering as a Dion McGregor nightmare, Thought Gang reveals Lynch and Badalamenti’s shared drive to disrupt any through line or logical outcome, the sounds and words as baffling as dream logic". Kory Grow of Rolling Stone described the album as "unpredictable and uneven but also strangely compelling", echoing the sentiment of other reviewers that the music is at once magnetic and repulsive. Writing for Exclaim!, Jenna McClelland described the album as "for lovers of non-expositional storytelling, crude mystery, lipstick-red esoteric jazz, and noise".

Legacy 
In August 2021, American experimental band Xiu Xiu released a cover of "A Real Indication" along with new merchandise depicting the cover of their Twin Peaks cover album Plays the Music of Twin Peaks.

Track listing
All songs written by Angelo Badalamenti and David Lynch.

Personnel
All credits adapted from Thought Gang liner notes

Thought Gang
 Angelo Badalamenti – vocals, synths, piano, production
 David Lynch – lyrics, percussion, production, vocals, synths, guitar, mixing

Additional musicians
 Reggie Hamilton – acoustic bass, electric bass, guitar
 Gerry Brown – drums, percussion
 Tom Rainer – keyboards, clarinet, saxophone

Technical personnel
 Bruce Robb – engineering, mixing
 John Karpowich – engineering
 Josh Achziger – assistive engineering
 Mike Gibson – assistive engineering
 Mike Bozzi – mastering
 Art Pohlemus – mixing
 Dean Hurley – mixing, sequencing
 John Neff – mixing

References

External links
 Thought Gang on Bandcamp

2018 albums
Albums produced by David Lynch
David Lynch albums
Sacred Bones Records albums
Albums produced by Angelo Badalamenti
Angelo Badalamenti albums